A discography of Scottish pop singer Lulu.

Albums

Studio albums

Compilation albums

Other albums

Singles

1960s

1970s

1980s

1990s

2000/10s

Notes

References

External links
 
 Lulu partial discography

Discographies of British artists
Pop music discographies